Simonne Mathieu (  Passemard; (Spelled "Simone" in many sources.) 31 January 1908 – 7 January 1980) was a female tennis player from France, born in Neuilly-sur-Seine, Hauts-de-Seine who was active in the 1930s. 

During World War II, she created and led the Corps of French Volunteers in the Free French Forces.

Career
Mathieu is best remembered for winning two major singles titles at the French Championships (in 1938 and 1939), and for reaching the final of that tournament an additional six times, in 1929, 1932, 1933, 1935, 1936, and 1937. In those finals, she lost three times to Hilde Krahwinkel Sperling, twice to Helen Wills Moody, and once to Margaret Scriven.

Mathieu won 11 Grand Slam doubles championships: three women's doubles titles at Wimbledon (1933–34, 1937), six women's doubles titles at the French Championships (1933–34, 1936–39), and two mixed-doubles titles at the French Championships (1937–38). She completed the rare triple at the French Championships in 1938, winning the singles, women's doubles, and mixed-doubles titles.

Mathieu's 13 Grand Slam titles are second only to Suzanne Lenglen's 21 among French women.

According to A. Wallis Myers and John Olliff of The Daily Telegraph and the Daily Mail respectively, Mathieu was ranked in the world top 10 from 1929 through 1939 (no rankings were issued from 1940 through 1945), reaching a career high of world No. 3 in 1932.

The winners' trophy of the women's doubles event at the French Open is named in her honour as the Coupe Simonne-Mathieu.

World War II
During World War II, Captain Mathieu was founder of the Corps Féminin Français, the women's volunteer branch of the Free French Forces, similar to the British Auxiliary Territorial Service. Mathieu was succeeded in that position by Captain Hélène Terré. For their service, each woman was named an Officer of the Legion of Honor.

Honours
She was inducted into the International Tennis Hall of Fame in 2006.

In November 2017, the French Tennis Federation (FFT) announced that the third show-court at Roland Garros will be named Court Simonne-Mathieu in her honor.

Grand Slam finals

Singles: 8 (2 titles, 6 runner-ups)

Doubles: 13 (9 titles, 4 runner-ups)

Mixed doubles: 4 (2 titles, 2 runner-ups)

Grand Slam singles performance timeline

R = tournament restricted to French nationals and held under German occupation.

1In 1946, the French Championships were held after Wimbledon.

See also
 Performance timelines for all female tennis players who reached at least one Grand Slam final

References

External links
 

1908 births
1980 deaths
Sportspeople from Neuilly-sur-Seine
French female tennis players
French Championships (tennis) champions
Wimbledon champions (pre-Open Era)
International Tennis Hall of Fame inductees
Grand Slam (tennis) champions in women's singles
Grand Slam (tennis) champions in women's doubles
Grand Slam (tennis) champions in mixed doubles
Burials at Père Lachaise Cemetery
French Resistance members
French military personnel of World War II
20th-century French women